The House of Anjou-Châteaudun was a medieval house that once possessed the County of Anjou, the Viscounty of Châteaudun and the significant, wealthy Kingdom of Jerusalem.

Origin of the House of Châteaudun 
The House of Châteaudun descended from Gauzfred I (or Geoffrey I) whom Count Theobald I of Blois made viscount of Châteaudun in 956. Recent research makes him a direct-line agnatic descendant of the Frankish family Rorgonides.

Branches of the House of Châteaudun 
The House of Châteaudun split in distinct branches. Descended from Fulcuich, probably the second son of Gauzfred I, were:
 The lineage of the counts of Perche, extinct by 1217, with William II
 The line of viscounts of Châteaudun, extinct by 1249, with Geoffrey VI
 The lineage of the counts of Anjou, who acquired the land by the marriage of a grandson of Fulcois, Count Geoffrey II of Gâtinais with Ermengarde of Anjou, heiress of the House of Ingelger, and from whom the Plantagenets were descended

Genealogy 
Note: The dotted lines represent hypothetical relationships. 
It is not clear whether Hugh, Archbishop of Tours, and Adalaud of Château-Chinon are sons or grandsons of Geoffrey I of Châteaudun. Some sources say that Geoffrey had a son called Hugh, who was himself viscount of Châteaudun, and both the Archbishop of Tours and the Lord of Château-Chinon would in turn be his sons. The number of people called "Hugh" who were viscounts of Châteaudun is thus unclear, and the numbering of each viscount with this name could be wrong by 1. 
The parentage of Fulcois is also disputed. Some sources put him as the son of Geoffrey I of Châteaudun. Others claim he was his grandson-in-law through marriage to a granddaughter of Geoffrey called Melisende.

Sources 
 France Balade :
 les vicomtes de Châteaudun
 les comtes du Perche
 Foundation for Medieval Genealogy :
 Vicomtes de Châteaudun
 Comtes du Perche, comtes de Mortagne

References

Counts of Châteaudun
French noble families